International Transactions in Operational Research is a peer-reviewed academic journal which is published six times a year by Wiley-Blackwell on behalf of the International Federation of Operational Research Societies. The editorial mission of the journal is to advance the theory and practice of Operational Research and Management Science internationally. The current Editor is Celso C. Ribeiro, Universidade Federal Fluminense.

Abstracting and Indexing 
International Transactions in Operational Research is abstracted and indexed in the Social Sciences Citation Index, Scopus, ProQuest, EBSCO, and International Abstracts in Operations Research. According to the Journal Citation Reports, the journal has a 2011 impact factor of 0.648, ranking it 49th out of 77 journals in the category "Operations Research & Management Science" and 126th out of 168 journals in the category "Management".

Operational Research Hall of Fame 
In 2003, International Transactions in Operational Research introduced its ‘Hall of Fame’ feature, in which brief biographies of key figures in the OR field are published. Individuals who have been celebrated in this section of the journal include George Dantzig, Russell L. Ackoff and Jay Wright Forrester.

References

External links 
 

Wiley-Blackwell academic journals
English-language journals
Publications established in 1994